Ivan Andreyevich Yakimushkin (born 17 June 1996) is a Russian cross-country skier.

Career
Ivan Yakimushkin was born 17 June 1996 to a sportive family. He started cross-country skiing from the age of eight, his first coach was Galina Kabanova. His father Andrey Vladimirovich replaced her when Ivan was 12. Yakimushkin first trained in Murom, then in Tyumen.

At the 2015 Nordic Junior World Ski Championships in Almaty, Yakimushkin won silver in 10 km classical/freestyle skiathlon and gold as part of the relay team. A year later he won another gold medal, now in 15 km freestyle. His relay team finished second.

He debuted in the 2017–18 FIS World Cup season, in the sprint freestyle Stage World Cup in Lenzerheide, being part of the 2017–18 Tour de Ski. In the overall standings he was placed 21.

Yakimushkin won his first national championships title in Syktyvkar, in 15 km freestyle.

At the 2019 Winter Universiade in Krasnoyarsk, Yakimushkin won two gold medals, in 10 km classical and 10 km freestyle pursuit.

Yakimushkin has made a major breakthrough in 2020-2021. After scoring three individual podiums and showing solid performance in the Tour de Ski (4th place) he finished second in both overall and distance standings of the World Cup only behind his teammate Alexander Bolshunov. 
 
In an interview to the Russian Olympic Channel in February 2021 Yakimushkin said he has no special pre-race rituals or habits, underlined key role of his family in his athletic upbringing and career, and named Alexey Prokurorov as the only sportsperson he could call a kind of a childhood idol.
  
Yakimushkin is a student in the Oil Faculty at the Tyumen Industrial University.

Cross-country skiing results
All results are sourced from the International Ski Federation (FIS).

Olympic Games
 1 medal (1 silver)

Distance reduced to 30 km due to weather conditions.

World Championships
 1 medal – (1 silver)

World Cup

Season standings

Individual podiums
 5 podiums – (1 , 4 )

Team podiums
 1 victory – (1 )
 2 podiums – (2 )

Notes

References

External links

FLGR Profile

1996 births
Living people
Russian male cross-country skiers
Universiade medalists in cross-country skiing
Tour de Ski skiers
Universiade gold medalists for Russia
Competitors at the 2019 Winter Universiade
FIS Nordic World Ski Championships medalists in cross-country skiing
Cross-country skiers at the 2022 Winter Olympics
Medalists at the 2022 Winter Olympics
Olympic silver medalists for the Russian Olympic Committee athletes
Olympic cross-country skiers of Russia
Olympic medalists in cross-country skiing
Sportspeople from Vladimir Oblast